Jacob Eiler Bang (19 December 1899 in Frederiksberg - 16 March 1965 in Kongens Lyngby) was a Danish glass designer. Bang originally studied architecture but soon changed to glass design. He joined Holmegaard Glass Factory in 1928 at a time when the company was in serious financial trouble. His functionalist glass designs received significant acclaim at international exhibitions.

References

External links 
 Entry in Kunstindeks Danmark

1899 births
1965 deaths
Danish designers